Marquez Reshard Valdes-Scantling (born October 10, 1994) is an American football wide receiver for the Kansas City Chiefs of the National Football League (NFL). He played college football at NC State and South Florida, and was drafted by the Green Bay Packers in the fifth round of the 2018 NFL Draft.

Early years
Valdes-Scantling attended and played high school football at Lakewood High School. He recorded 50 receptions for 800 receiving yards and 14 receiving touchdowns as a senior.

College career
Valdes-Scantling played college football at NC State from 2013 to 2014 and South Florida from 2015 to 2017. He had to sit out the 2015 season due to transfer rules.

College statistics

Professional career

Green Bay Packers

2018
Valdes-Scantling was drafted by the Green Bay Packers with the 174th overall pick in the fifth round of the 2018 NFL Draft. He signed his rookie contract on May 7, 2018. He made his NFL debut in the Packers' season opener against the Chicago Bears on September 9, 2018, recording a 21-yard kick return in the 24–23 victory. He recorded his first professional reception in the following game against the Minnesota Vikings. He started his first career game in place of the injured Randall Cobb in a Week 4 win over the Buffalo Bills, catching one pass for 38 yards. Still starting in place of Cobb during a Week 5 loss to the Detroit Lions, Valdes-Scantling had a breakout performance, notching seven receptions for 68 yards and a touchdown. He followed that up with a three-catch, 103-yard performance during a Week 6 win over the San Francisco 49ers. On October 28, 2018, in a 27–29 loss to the Los Angeles Rams, he had two receptions for 45 yards, including a 40-yard receiving touchdown. The following week, a 17–31 loss to the New England Patriots, he had three receptions for 101 yards. Overall, he finished his rookie season with 38 receptions for 581 receiving yards and two receiving touchdowns. He finished seventh among rookies in receiving yards.

2019
In Week 3 against the Denver Broncos, Valdes-Scantling caught six passes for 99 yards and his first receiving touchdown of the season as the Packers won 27–16. During Week 7 against the Oakland Raiders, Valdes-Scantling finished with two catches for 133 receiving yards, including a 74-yard touchdown as the Packers won 42–24. Overall, Valdes-Scatling finished the 2019 season with 26 receptions for 452 receiving yards and two receiving touchdowns.

2020
In Week 1 against the Minnesota Vikings, Valdes-Scantling caught four passes for 96 yards and his first touchdown of the season during the 43–34 win.  In Week 9 against the San Francisco 49ers on Thursday Night Football, he had two receptions for 53 receiving yards and two touchdowns in the 34–17 victory. In Week 10, against the Jacksonville Jaguars, he had four receptions for 149 receiving yards, including a 78-yard receiving touchdown, during the 24–20 win. In Week 11 against the Indianapolis Colts, Valdes-Scantling recorded a key 47-yard catch on a late fourth quarter drive that resulted in a game-tying field goal by Mason Crosby. However, he also lost a fumble on the Packers' second play in overtime, allowing the Colts to kick the game-winning field goal.
Valdes-Scantling later tweeted that he received death threats after the game.

In the NFC Championship against the Tampa Bay Buccaneers, Valdes-Scantling recorded four catches for 115 yards and a touchdown during the 31–26 loss.

2021
Valdes-Scantling was placed on injured reserve on October 2, 2021. He was activated from injured reserve on November 6, 2021. In Week 11, against the Minnesota Vikings, he had four receptions for 123 yards and a touchdown in the 34–31 loss. He finished the 2021 season with 26 receptions for 430 receiving yards and three receiving touchdowns.

Kansas City Chiefs
On March 24, 2022, Valdes-Scantling signed a three-year, $30 million contract with the Kansas City Chiefs. In Week 7, against the San Francisco 49ers, he had three receptions for 111 yards in the 44–23 victory. In the 2022 regular season, he had 42 receptions for 687 receiving yards and two receiving touchdowns in 17 games, of which he started 11. In the AFC Championship Game, Valdes-Scantling caught six passes for 111 yards and a touchdown helping the Chiefs defeat the Cincinnati Bengals 23-20. Valdes-Scantling won his first Super Bowl championship in the 38–35 victory over the Philadelphia Eagles in Super Bowl LVII. He was targeted once with no receptions in the game.

NFL career statistics

Regular season

Postseason

References

External links

Kansas City Chiefs bio
USF Bulls bio

Living people
1994 births
American football wide receivers
Green Bay Packers players
Lakewood High School (Florida) alumni
Kansas City Chiefs players
NC State Wolfpack football players
Players of American football from St. Petersburg, Florida
South Florida Bulls football players